Liberation was a 20th-century pacifist journal published 1956 through 1977 in the United States. A bimonthly and later a monthly, the magazine identified in the 1960s with the New Left.

History
Liberation was founded, published, and edited by David Dellinger, Bayard Rustin, Sidney Lens, Roy Finch, and A. J. Muste out of New York City and Glen Gardner, New Jersey. Muste brought funding from the War Resisters League. For Rustin, the magazine was a major commitment of time and energy, raising money and meeting every week with Muste. He wrote to Martin Luther King Jr., who later wrote for the magazine. The June 1963 issue contained the first full publication of King's "Letter from Birmingham Jail" and the first version with that title.

Liberation: An Independent Monthly published its first issue in April 1956.

The editorial positions of the magazine were somewhat comparable to those of Dissent and Studies on the Left. David Dellinger's support of the Cuban Castro regime caused a rift at the magazine, with philosophy professor Roy Finch resigning as an editor. Editorially, Liberation supported the Cuban Revolution, and published C. Wright Mills' article "Listen, Yankee!" The magazine supported Students for a Democratic Society and opposed the Vietnam War.

The magazine supported Fellowship of Reconciliation (FoR) organizers, and its editorial offices at times served as a clearinghouse for activists conducting non-violent resistance.

Liberation occasionally ran investigative pieces. In early 1965, the magazine ran long articles by Vincent Salandria challenging the conclusions of the Warren Commission. In 1975 it published an article by Fred Landis on psychological warfare by the CIA in Chile.

A poem by Louis Ginsberg, father of Allen Ginsberg, was published in the magazine. Children's book author Vera Williams made the artwork for many of the covers.

By 1977 the magazine was edited by Jan Edwards and Michael Nill out of Cambridge, Massachusetts. It ceased publication not long after the departure of Dellinger.

Seeds of Liberation, a collection of Liberation articles, was edited by Paul Goodman and published in 1965.

Legacy 

Liberation, together with Dissent, anticipated changes in the 1950s American political left, such as the early civil rights movement and nonviolent protest.

References

Bibliography 

 
 
 
 
 
 

1956 establishments in New York City
1977 disestablishments in Massachusetts
Civil rights movement
Defunct political magazines published in the United States
Pacifism in the United States
Magazines disestablished in 1977
Magazines established in 1956
Magazines published in Boston
Magazines published in New York City
Quarterly magazines published in the United States
Socialist magazines